Mark Alan Hewitt (born March 31, 1953) is an American architect, preservationist and architectural historian, known for his work on architectural history and the history of architectural drawing "as a medium of thought."

Biography 
Born in Berwyn, Illinois, Hewitt attended Sammamish High School in Bellevue, Washington, graduating in 1971. He went to Yale University to study acting and English literature, but after taking a class with architectural historian Vincent Scully, changed his major to architecture. After graduating from Yale in 1975, he pursued a Master of Architecture degree at the University of Pennsylvania, studying with Allan Greenberg, Robert A.M. Stern, David Van Zanten, and Steven Izenour.

After graduating from Penn in 1978, Hewitt apprenticed for two years with the architecture firm Venturi, Rauch and Scott Brown. While there, he taught a studio at Penn with architect Steve Izenour called Beach, Boardwalk and Boulevard: The Built Environment of Atlantic City, NJ that later became an exhibition at the Cooper-Hewitt Museum in New York.

Hewitt has taught architecture and historic preservation at Rice University, Columbia University, New Jersey Institute of Technology, and, most recently, as a visiting faculty member at Rutgers University.

Hewitt was the recipient of an NEH Fellowship at the Winterthur Museum in 1996, and was honored with the Arthur Ross Award in 2009 for his writing on classical architecture. He lives and practices in Sutton, New Hampshire.

Hewitt is a Fellow of the American Institute of Architects. He sings with a number of choral and a cappella groups, including Ridge Light Opera, the Alumni of the Yale Russian Chorus, and Harmonium: A Classical Choral Society.

Work 
Hewitt's research and writing has addressed American architecture and architects from 1880 to 1940, American country houses and domestic architecture, classical architecture and treatises on the orders, the work of Gustav Stickley, and architectural conservation. His latest research, on the neuroscience of design, resulted in the publication of the first cognitive history of architectural design in 2020.<ref>Hewitt, Mark Alan, Draw In Order to See: a cognitive history of architectural design (San Francisco, ORO Editions: 2020).</ref>

Hewitt currently practices architecture under the name Mark Alan Hewitt Architects.  The firm primarily addresses historic preservation and residential architecture with projects including restoration and renovation, new additions and some entirely new buildings.

 Selected publications 
 Hewitt, Mark Alan, The Architect and the American Country House, 1890-1940 Yale University Press, New Haven and London, 1990.  
 Hewitt, Mark Alan, Architecture of Mott B. Schmidt, Rizzoli, New York 1991, 
 Hewitt, Mark Alan, Gustav Stickley's Craftsman Farms: The Quest for an Arts and Crafts Utopia, Syracuse University Press, Syracuse NY, 2001, 
 Hewitt, Mark Alan, and Bock, Gordon (co-authors), The Vintage House: A Guide to Successful Renovations and Additions, W.W. Norton, New York, 2011, 
 Hewitt, Mark Alan, Lemos, Kate, Morrison, William and Warren, Charles D. (co-authors),  Carrere & Hastings, Architects, Acanthus Press,  2006, 
Hewitt, Mark Alan, Kennedy-Grant, Philip, Mills, Michael J. (co-authors), AIA New Jersey Guidebook: 150 Best Buildings and Places, Rutgers University Press, 2011, 
Hewitt, Mark Alan, Draw In Order To See: A Cognitive History of Architectural Design, Oro Editions, San Francisco, 2020,  
Articles, a selection 
 Hewitt, Mark. "Representational Forms and Modes of Conception; an Approach to the History of Architectural Drawing." Journal of Architectural Education 39.2 (1985): 2-9.
 Hewitt, Mark A. "The Imaginary Mountain: The Significance of Contour in Alvar Aalto's Sketches." Perspecta (1989): 163-177.
 Hewitt, Mark Alan. "Architecture for a contingent environment." Journal of Architectural Education 47.4 (1994): 197-209.
 Hewitt, Mark Alan. "Sketches as Cognitive Traces: Aalto at Imatra." New Design Ideas'' 2.1 (2019): 1-20.

Filmography

Television

References

External links
 Mark Alan Hewitt Architects
 Frozen Music; A preservation architect looks at the built environment blog by Mark Alan Hewitt

Living people
1953 births
American architecture writers
American architectural historians
American biographers
Architects from New Jersey
Preservationist architects
New Classical architects
American male biographers
Fellows of the American Institute of Architects
University of Pennsylvania School of Design alumni
Yale School of Architecture alumni
People from Cook County, Illinois
Historians from Illinois